Henry Thomas Mudd (December 26, 1913 – September 10, 1990) was an American heir, businessman and philanthropist. He served as chairman and chief executive officer of the Cyprus Mines Corporation. He also co-founded Harvey Mudd College in Claremont, California.

Biography

Early life
He was born in Los Angeles, California in 1913. His father was Harvey Seeley Mudd (1888–1955) and his mother, Mildred Esterbrook Mudd (1891–1958). He had a sister, Caryll Mudd Sprague (1914–1978). His paternal uncle was Seeley G. Mudd (1895–1968). His paternal grandfather was Seeley W. Mudd (1861–1926).

He received a B.A. from Stanford University in 1935, and an MS in Mining Engineering from the Massachusetts Institute of Technology in Cambridge, Massachusetts in 1938. He then served in the Second World War.

Career
He served as president of the American Institute of Mining, Metallurgical, and Petroleum Engineers in 1945. The following year, in 1946, he started his career at the Cyprus Mines Corporation, his family business, as assistant general manager. By 1955, he became its chairman and chief executive officer. He also sat on the board of directors of KCET, a public television station.

Philanthropy
Together with his mother, he co-founded Harvey Mudd College in Claremont, California in 1955. He served on its board of trustees from 1958 to 1981.

He sat on the boards of trustees of the Los Angeles County Museum of Art, the Los Angeles Civic Light Opera Association and the Los Angeles World Affairs Council.

Personal life
He was married to Victoria Nebeker Coberly. They had two sons and two daughters. After his death, his estate was sued for palimony by a woman he allegedly had an affair with.

References

1913 births
1990 deaths
Stanford University alumni
MIT School of Engineering alumni
American chief executives
20th-century American businesspeople
20th-century American philanthropists